Anand Persaud (born in Guyana) is a Guyanese politician. He is a current Minister of Local Government and Regional Development in Guyana. Persaud was sworn into President Irfaan Ali's cabinet. He was appointed Minister in August 2020.

References 

Living people
Members of the National Assembly (Guyana)
Government ministers of Guyana
People's Progressive Party (Guyana) politicians
South American political people
Year of birth missing (living people)
Guyanese people of Indian descent